Puhvel is a surname of Estonian origin. Notable people with the surname include:

Jaan Puhvel (born 1932), Estonian-American Indo-Europeanist and mythographer
Martin Puhvel (1933–2016), Estonian-Canadian philologist

Estonian-language surnames